Vilhelm Johansen (16 September 1898 – 21 December 1993) was a Danish sports shooter. He competed in the 50 m rifle event at the 1936 Summer Olympics.

References

External links
 

1898 births
1993 deaths
Danish male sport shooters
Olympic shooters of Denmark
Shooters at the 1936 Summer Olympics
People from Frederikssund Municipality
Sportspeople from the Capital Region of Denmark
20th-century Danish people